Selene brevoortii, the hairfin look down, also known as the airfin lookdown, Mexican lookdown or Pacific lookdown, is a species of carangid fish native to warmer parts of the East Pacific where it is found from southernmost California, United States to northern Peru (occasionally south as far as Chile). It is of minor importance to local commercial fisheries, but is popular as a gamefish. Its specific name honours the American book collector, numismatist, amateur naturalist and friend of Theodore N. Gills J. Carson Brevoort (1817-1887) for his interest in the fishes of the family Carangidae.

References

brevoortii
Fish of Mexican Pacific coast
Western Central American coastal fauna
Fish of Colombia
Fish of Ecuador
Fish described in 1863